Provolino was an Italian puppet character who enjoyed huge success in Italy between the late 1960s and early 1970s. He was created by Castellano and Pipolo who also wrote the dialogues.

Television

The puppet was introduced by Raffaele Pisu in the RAI variety shows Vengo anch'io and Ma che domenica amici in 1968. A baby with big teeth, he was featured as the disrespectful alter ego of Pisu, with whom he had constant bickering which   always ended with the catchphrase: "Boccaccia mia statti zitta!" (i.e. "bad mouth of mine, please shut up!"). The puppet was animated by the same Pisu and voiced by Oreste Lionello.

Comics adaptation

The character was later adapted into a comic series, which was created by Pier Luigi Sangalli and Alberico Motta and which became the title character of several comics magazines (Provolino, Super Provolino and Provolino Story) published by editor Bianconi between 1970 and 1990.

References 

Puppets
Italian children's television series
Italian television shows featuring puppetry
1960s Italian television series
1970 comics debuts
1990 comics endings
Italian comics characters
Fictional Italian people
Humor comics
Comics characters introduced in 1970
Children's magazines published in Italy
Comics magazines published in Italy
Italian-language magazines
Defunct magazines published in Italy
Child characters in television
Child characters in comics
Television shows adapted into comics